Odoiporosaurus is an extinct genus of pachypleurosaur known from the Middle Triassic (middle Anisian stage) Besano Formation (Grenzbitumenzone) of northern Italy. It contains a single species, Odoiporosaurus teruzzii. Odoiporosaurus is the sister taxon of the group formed by Serpianosaurus and Neusticosaurus, and together with the older and more primitive Dactylosaurus plus Anarosaurus clade, they form a monophyletic group of European pachypleurosaurids.

References

Triassic plesiosaurs
Fossil taxa described in 2014
Fossils of Italy
Anisian life
Sauropterygian genera